Aljean Meltsir Harmetz (born December 30, 1929) is an American journalist and film historian. She was the Hollywood correspondent for The New York Times from 1978 to 1990.

Her film books include The Making of The Wizard of Oz (1977), a detailed study of the classic 1939 film The Wizard of Oz, and Round Up the Usual Suspects: The Making of Casablanca: Bogart, Bergman, and World War II (1992).

Early life and education
Born in 1929, Harmetz began life as Aljean Meltsir Levin and grew up in Southern California, near the Metro-Goldwyn-Mayer studios, where her mother worked in the wardrobe department.
She is a graduate of Beverly Hills High School and a Phi Beta Kappa graduate of Stanford University, summa cum laude. While at Stanford, she was a reporter for The Stanford Daily.

The Making of The Wizard of Oz

In the mid-1970s, Harmetz began writing a book about the production of the 1939 MGM film, The Wizard of Oz. She interviewed over fifty surviving cast and crew members from the film, including Ray Bolger, Jack Haley, producer Mervyn LeRoy, writer Noel Langley, songwriter Yip Harburg, and Wicked Witch actress Margaret Hamilton, who became a personal friend.

The book was published by Knopf in 1977, and has never been out of print. It was re-released in 2013 for the 75th anniversary of the film.

In 1979, Harmetz wrote and narrated a television documentary about the making of The Wizard of Oz for KCET titled, The Wizardry of Oz. The documentary included filmed interviews with Bolger, Haley, LeRoy, and Margaret Hamilton, and was shown three times nationally on PBS. It was nominated for a local Emmy.

Harmetz hosted a tribute to The Wizard of Oz at the Academy of Motion Picture Arts and Sciences in 1982. The event featured a panel of six remaining cast and crew members, moderated by Harmetz.

Off the Face of the Earth
Harmetz’s Off the Face of the Earth is a suspense novel about a boy's abduction and the efforts to free him. It was published by Scribner in 1997 and as a paperbound by Pocket Books in 1998.

The Sunday New York Daily News called the book "a sizzling summertime thriller" and added, "Harmetz spins her tale with taut, wiry prose, and her pages are filled with insight and intrigue. You might have nightmares after reading this book, but you won't regret it."

Publishers Weekly called the book "engrossing," a "tightly controlled, intelligently told, acutely creepy debut thriller." Glamour called it the "best of the beach reads....a terrifying but revealing take on the most universal of horror stories." And The New York Times Book Review said of the book: "well above the classic thriller fare... powerful... psychologically complex... lingers in the mind well after the reader has raced through its pages to the conclusion."

Other work
Harmetz was the Hollywood correspondent of The New York Times from 1978 to 1990.

She wrote a teaser trailer for the 1978 film The Wiz and provided the map of the Land of Oz.

She has written for magazines, publishing poetry in The Atlantic and a Best First Story in Ellery Queen's Mystery Magazine. She has contributed articles to Esquire, The New Republic, Cosmopolitan, The New York Times, TV Guide, Architectural Digest, and the Los Angeles Times.

Round Up the Usual Suspects: The Making of "Casablanca" was published by Hyperion in 1992 and has been called “pretty much the definitive sourcebook on Casablanca. In September of that year, a documentary, Casablanca: Round Up the Usual Suspects, based on the book, was screened on Showtime.
 
She has written dozens of celebrity obituaries for The New York Times since retiring in 1990. Her obituaries include: Mickey Rooney, Lena Horne, Shirley Temple, Billy Wilder, Jack Lemmon, Doris Day, Dina Merrill, and Paul Newman, and Tab Hunter.

Harmetz also wrote and narrated a documentary on video games for The Disney Channel.

Awards and recognition
Harmetz is a recipient of Yale University's Poynter Fellowship, an award for distinguished journalism.

In 1993, her book The Making of The Wizard of Oz was named by The Book Collectors (Los Angeles) as one of the hundred best books ever written on the movies. It was honored at a reception hosted by the Academy of Motion Picture Arts and Sciences.

Criticism
In a 1988 article, Spy magazine characterized Harmetz as possibly "the most inexplicable journalist in Hollywood. If Harmetz writes a story, then it is either (a) wrong, (b) late, (c) trivial or (d) designed to advance the career of one of her sources. Or all of the above."

Personal life
Aljean Levin married to Richard Harmetz On August 9, 1959, and they have three children. They live in Los Angeles.

She is related by marriage to the corporate lawyer, Lloyd Harmetz.

Selected works
 My Three Sons (1960)
 "The Way Childbirth Really Is" in Today's Health, February 1972
 The Making of The Wizard of Oz  (Knopf, 1977) 
 Rolling Breaks and Other Movie Business  (Random House, 1983) 
 Round Up the Usual Suspects: The Making of "Casablanca" (Hyperion, 1992) 
 On the Road to Tara: The Making of Gone with the Wind (Harry N. Abrams, 1996) 
 Off the Face of the Earth (Scribner, 1997)

References

External links
 
 

1929 births
20th-century American novelists
American women novelists
American film historians
Living people
Place of birth missing (living people)
The New York Times writers
Writers from California
American women historians
20th-century American women writers
Novelists from New York (state)
20th-century American non-fiction writers
21st-century American women